Keohane may refer to:

People
Jimmy Keohane (born 1991), Irish footballer
Joe Keohane (1918–1988), Irish Gaelic football player, manager, and selector
Kay Keohane-O'Riordan (1910–1991), Irish communist activist
Michael Keohane (athlete) (fl. 1996–2000), American paralympic athlete and Paralympics competitor
Michael Keohane (racing driver) (born 1980), Irish race car driver
Nannerl O. Keohane (born 1940), American political theorist and university president
Nat Keohane (fl. 1993–2012), American environmental economist
Patrick Keohane (1879–1950), Irish Antarctic explorer
Patrick Keohane (politician) (1870–1939), Irish politician
Robert Keohane (born 1941), American political scientist, writer, and academic

Other uses
Mount Keohane, an Antarctic peak
Thompson v. Keohane, a 1995 US Supreme Court case
Keohane North American Swiss Teams, a North American contract bridge competition

See also
Kehoe (disambiguation)
Keogh (disambiguation)
Keoghan (surname)
Keough (disambiguation)
KHNE (disambiguation)
Kohan (disambiguation)